Water skiing competitions at the 2019 Pan American Games in Lima, Peru were held between July 27th and 30th, 2019 at the La Laguna de Bujama in the district of Mala.

There were a total of ten events held, equally split among men and women. Women's wakeboarding made its Pan American Games debut.

Medalists

Medal table

Men's events

Women's events

Participating nations
A total of 10 countries qualified athletes. The number of athletes a nation entered is in parentheses beside the name of the country.

Qualification

A total of 48 athletes will qualify to compete at the games. The top seven nations (including the host nation, Peru) at the 2018 Pan American Water Skiing Championship, will each receive four athlete quotas. The remaining spots (four) will be distributed as two per nation (one per gender) to the next best ranked countries. A further 8 spots are made available for wakeboard qualifiers in each event. A nation may enter a maximum of six athletes, with the host nation Peru receiving automatic qualification for all six spots.

References

External links
Results book

 
Events at the 2019 Pan American Games
2019